Anatololacerta finikensis is a species of lizard endemic to Turkey. It has also been found in Greece, on the island of Psomi.

References

Anatololacerta
Reptiles described in 1987
Taxa named by Josef Eiselt
Taxa named by Josef Friedrich Schmidtler
Endemic fauna of Turkey